The Philippines national under-21 football team represents the Philippines in international youth football competitions.

Coaches
  Zoran Đorđević (2012)
  Jim Fraser (2014-)

Tournament records

Hassanal Bolkiah Trophy

See also
 Football in the Philippines

Men's
 Philippines national football team
 Philippines national under-23 football team
 Philippines national under-19 football team
 Philippines national under-17 football team

Women's
 Philippines women's national football team
 Philippines women's national under-20 football team

References

u-21
Asian national under-21 association football teams
under-21